This is a list of professional wrestling promotions in Japan which includes both national and independent puroresu and joshi companies from the post-World War II period up to the present day.

Major promotions

Puroresu

Joshi

Independent promotions

Puroresu

Joshi

Defunct promotions

Puroresu

Joshi

See also

List of professional wrestling attendance records in Japan
List of professional wrestling promotions
List of women's wrestling promotions

References

External links
Pro-Wrestling Organizations in Japan at Puroresu.com
A beginners guide to Joshi Puroresu at Wrestling101.com

Promotions in Japan
professional wrestling